Ostrožac is a village in the municipality of Jablanica, Bosnia and Herzegovina. It is located on the south banks of Jablaničko lake.

Demographics 
According to the 2013 census, its population was 738.

References

Populated places in Jablanica, Bosnia and Herzegovina